Makoto Yoshino (吉野 誠, born November 19, 1977) is a Japanese former professional baseball pitcher in Nippon Professional Baseball. He played for the Hanshin Tigers from 2000 to 2007 and the Orix Buffaloes from 2008 to 2013.

External links

NPB.com

1977 births
Living people
Baseball people from Saitama Prefecture
Nihon University alumni
Japanese baseball players
Nippon Professional Baseball pitchers
Orix Buffaloes players
Hanshin Tigers players